Maden is a town (belde) in Elazığ Province of Turkey. It is the seat of Maden District. Its population is 3,662 (2021). The mayor is Orhan Yavuz Nationalist Movement Party (MHP).

Notable people
Nûredin Zaza, politician
Fatih Kısaparmak, musician

References

Towns in Turkey
Populated places in Elazığ Province
Maden District
Kurdish settlements in Elazığ Province